The following lists the stations of all urban rail transit systems in Bangkok, including the BTS, MRT, Airport Rail Link and SRT. The table below lists 139 stations in operation, comprising:
 47 stations on the BTS Sukhumvit Line
 14 stations on the BTS Silom Line 
 3 stations on the Gold Line
 38 stations on the MRT Blue Line
 16 stations on the MRT Purple Line
 8 stations on the Airport Rail Link
 10 stations on the SRT Dark Red Line
 4 stations on the SRT Light Red Line

This totals 140 stations, however Siam is shared between the Sukhumvit and Silom lines, and is counted only once and shown once in the table below.

Several interchange stations share the same name but have different identifiers, are counted twice and appear twice in the table below, including Phaya Thai (Airport Rail Link and Sukhumvit Line), Bang Wa (Silom Line and Blue Line), Krung Thon Buri (Silom Line and Gold Line), Tao Poon (Blue Line and Purple Line), Bang Son (Purple Line and Light Red Line), and Bang Sue (Blue Line, Light Red line, and Dark Red Line). In other cases where there are designated interchanges between different networks, the two stations are given different names, such as Asok BTS station to Sukhumvit MRT and these are also counted separately. The Tha Phra station is passed twice in one full ride on the Blue Line but is counted only once.

Many more are currently in various stages of planning and construction as shown in the latest Mass Rapid Transit Master Plan.

List of stations

See also
 Airport Rail Link (Bangkok)
 Bangkok BRT
 BTS Skytrain
 Gold Line
 Mass Rapid Transit (Bangkok)
 Sukhumvit Line
 Silom Line
 MRT Brown Line
 MRT Grey Line
 MRT Light Blue Line
 MRT Orange Line
 MRT Pink Line
 MRT Purple Line
 MRT Yellow Line
 SRT Red Lines

Rapid transit in Bangkok
Rapid transit
Bangkok rapid transit
Bangkok